No Mundane Options is The Paddingtons' second album, released on 3 November 2008, and released through their own Mama Bear record label.

Track listing
"Punk R.I.P."
"What's The Point in Anything New"
"Shame about Elle"
"No Mundane Options"
"Sticky Fingers"
"Molotov Cocktail"
"You & I"
"Plastic Men"
"Stand Down"
"Gangs"
"Heartsong"

Critical reception 
NME gave No Mundane Options a score of 6/10, saying that the album "finds [The Paddingtons] slumping into forgettable filler territory". James Skinner of Drowned in Sound gave the album a score of 4/10, finding that the Paddingtons "remain depressingly, predictably futile".

References

2008 albums
The Paddingtons albums